is a former Japanese football player.

Club statistics

References

External links

 
j-league

1986 births
Living people
Association football people from Toyama Prefecture
Japanese footballers
J1 League players
J2 League players
Japan Soccer College players
Albirex Niigata players
Kataller Toyama players
Japanese expatriate footballers
Japanese expatriate sportspeople in Singapore
Expatriate footballers in Singapore
Japanese expatriate sportspeople in Thailand
Expatriate footballers in Thailand
Association football midfielders